Giacomo Cavedone (also called Giacomo Cavedoni) (1577–1660) was an Italian Baroque painter of the Bolognese School.

Life
He belonged to the generation of Carracci-inspired or trained painters that included Giovanni Andrea Donducci (Mastelletta); Alessandro Tiarini, Lucio Massari, Leonello Spada and Lorenzo Garbieri. 
He was born in Sassuolo, near Modena, and was able to obtain a three-year stipend to apprentice with Bernardino Baldi and Annibale Carracci. 
In the autumn of 1609, he sojourned in Rome for a year to work under Guido Reni, and is known to have worked in Venice from 1612 to 1613. 
He became one of Ludovico Carracci's primary assistants, and upon Ludovico's death in 1619 became Caposindaco of the Accademia degli Incamminati.

His career as a painter was cut short by a set of misfortunes; these included a 1623 fall from a church scaffold and, in 1630, the death of his wife and children from the plague. The 1911 Britannica (where he is incorrectly called Jacopo Cavendone) claims his wife was accused of witchcraft. 
He lived until 1660, and died in poverty.

His principal works are the Adoration of the Magi, the Four Doctors, Last Supper; and his masterpiece, the large altar painting in the Pinacoteca di Bologna, Virgin and Child in Glory with San Petronio and Saint Alo (1614). His paintings have a traditional Ludovico Carracci-inspired structure, with a Madonna and her wafting robes hovering above donors, with an unusually rich Titianesque coloring for an Emilian painter. Among his pupils were Giovanni Andrea Sirani, Giovanni Battista Cavazza, Ottavio Corradi, and Flaminio Torre.

Partial anthology

Saint Stephen in Glory, (1601, Galleria Estense, Modena)
Deposition, (Santuario di Caravaggio)
Death of Saint Peter Martyr, (Pinacoteca Nazionale, Bologna)
Baptism of Christ, (1611–12, San Pietro Martire, Modena)
Sant'Alo Altarpiece, (1614, Pinacoteca Nazionale, Bologna)
Discovery of Miraculous Crucifix of Beirut, (1622, San Salvatore, Bologna)
Adoration of the Shepherds, (San Paolo Maggiore, Bologna)
Adoration of the Kings, (San Paolo Maggiore, Bologna)
Seated Warrior Holding a Sword and Shield, (drawing, c. 1612, National Gallery of Art)
Sketch for The Last Supper; verso: The Conversion of St. Paul, Fogg Art Museum)
The Miracle of the Loaves and Fishes (drawing, 1611–1614, Fitzwilliam Museum, Cambridge)
Judith of Holofernes & Complaint of Job

References

Attribution

Sources
The Art of Corregio and the Carracci. Monograph (1986-7)

1577 births
1660 deaths
Artists from the Province of Modena
16th-century Italian painters
Italian male painters
17th-century Italian painters
Painters from Bologna
Italian Baroque painters
People from Sassuolo